TV Câmara is a Brazilian public television network responsible for broadcasting activities from the Brazilian Chamber of Deputies. Created in 1998, it broadcasts 24 hours a day from the Chamber.

Censorship
In March 2009, Chamber President Michel Temer, at the request of Renato Parente, head of the Supreme Federal Court's press service, ordered the removal from TV Câmara's website of a debate in which CartaCapital journalist Leandro Fortes criticized Gilmar Mendes' tenure as Court President. Many viewed this episode as political censorship and the video was soon posted on YouTube. After being denounced of censorship by the country's main bodies representative of journalists, TV Câmara put the debate back on its website.

References

External links

Legislature broadcasters
Television networks in Brazil
Portuguese-language television stations in Brazil
Television channels and stations established in 1998
1998 establishments in Brazil